To Be a Better Man (Chinese: 好先生) is a 2016 Chinese television series produced by LeEco and directed by Zhang Xiaobo. It stars Sun Honglei, Jiang Shuying, Wao Yaoqing, Che Xiao, Lay Zhang and Guan Xiaotong. The series was aired on Jiangsu TV and Zhejiang TV from 31 May to 22 June 2016.

Synopsis
Lu Yuan worked hard in America to become a Michelin 3-star chef. To many, he is the Devil incarnate, reckless and wanton. But when it comes to the person he loves, he is an entirely different "good man" who is loyal, kind, and honest. After a nightmarish car accident takes away his friend, he returns home with his remains.

Now returning to China, Lu Yuan initially has three goals. First, he wants to bring the ashes of his friend, who died in the car accident, back to China and let them rest in peace. Second, he wants to return his best friend’s seventeen-year-old daughter Jia He to her birth mother, before finding a remote place and committing suicide. However unexpectedly, he met the person he least wants to see and becomes entangled with both his unresolved and new relationships.

Cast
Sun Honglei as Lu Yuan
Jiang Shuying as Jiang Lai
Wang Yaoqing as Jiang Haokun
Che Xiao as Gan Jing
Lay Zhang as Xiao Cai
Guan Xiaotong as Peng Jiahe
Dong Yong as Peng Hai
Wan Qian as Xu Li
Feng Jiayi as Manager Hui Jing

Soundtrack

Reception
The drama is both a critical and commercial success. It received acclaim for its heart-warming and realistic storyline, strong performance of its leads as well as cinematography and costume design. According to NetEase, the drama discusses from a detached point of view on searching for the true meaning of life in a society where people blindly chase after materialistic wants. It also touches on the importance of trust, family and love.

Ratings 

 Highest ratings are marked in red, lowest ratings are marked in blue

Awards and nominations

International broadcast

References

External links
 To Be a Better Man (Sina.com direct)

2016 Chinese television series debuts
Television shows set in Shanghai
Chinese romance television series
2016 Chinese television series endings
Jiangsu Television original programming
Chinese drama television series
Television series by Linmon Pictures